Gierałtowiczki  is a village in the administrative district of Gmina Wieprz, within Wadowice County, Lesser Poland Voivodeship, in southern Poland.

The village has a population of 460.

References

Villages in Wadowice County